Summer Naomi Smart (also known under the name Summer Naomi) is an American actress and singer. Smart has won two Joseph Jefferson Awards, one in 2008 and one in 2009.

Early life
Smart grew up in Salt Lake City as the youngest of seven girls and began acting while in middle school. After graduating from Hillcrest High School in Midvale, Utah, she worked as a musical entertainment performer at Lagoon Park in Farmington, Utah while attending Brigham Young University. Smart graduated from BYU in 2005 with a BFA in Music, Dance, and Theatre and during her stay there she participated in the university's Young Ambassadors program.

Awards
Joseph Jefferson Award (2008) for Sweet Charity
Joseph Jefferson Award (2009) for "Actress in a Supporting Role" for The Light in the Piazza

Filmography

Film

Stage Productions
Aida (2006) as Amneris 
Wicked (2007-2008) as Nessarose 
Hollywood Sings (2006-2007) Ensemble Member 
Sweet Charity (2008) as Charity Hope Valentine 
The Full Monty (2008) as Pam Lukowski 
Noises Off (2008) as Brooke Ashton 
Camelot (2009) as Green Boy 
A Christmas Carol (2009) Ensemble 
The Light in the Piazza (2009) as Clara Johnson 
Ragtime (2010) as Ensemble, Evelyn Nesbit 
Hot Mikado (2010) as Yum-Yum 
For the Boys (2011) as Margaret, Luanna Trott, Myra u/s 
Seussical as Bird Girl 
Legally Blonde (2012) as Shandi, Brooke Wyndham 
Hero the Musical (2012) as Adele  
Sleeping Beauty (2012) as Princess Amber 
My One and Only (2012) as Edythe Herbert 
Barnum (2013) as Jenny Lind 
Seussical as Mrs. Mayor 
Shrek the Musical (2013) as Princess Fiona 
Mary Poppins as Mary Poppins (2013-2014) 
Cats (2014) as Bombalurina 
The Beverly Hillbillies:  The Musical (2014) as Elly May 
Women on the Verge of a Nervous Breakdown (2014) as Candela 
Anything Goes (2015) as Hope Harcourt 
City of Angels (2015)

Sources

External links
 

Latter Day Saints from Utah
Living people
Brigham Young University alumni
Actresses from Salt Lake City
American women singers
1982 births